Epilobophora is a genus of moths in the family Geometridae first described by Inoue in 1943.

Species
 Epilobophora kostjuki Tikhonov, 1994
 Epilobophora sabinata (Geyer, 1831)

References

Trichopterygini